Lena Karpunina (1963 — November 4, 2013) was an Esperanto-language writer in Tajikistan (then a part of the Soviet Union). Born in what is now Russia, she grew up in the Tajik capital of Dushanbe, then was forced to leave for Germany due to the Tajikistani Civil War. From 2010 until her death, she was a member of the Akademio de Esperanto, chosen primarily in recognition of her work in the field of literature.

Life 
Jelena Karpunina, known as Lena, was born in 1963 in Kaluga, Soviet Union, in what is now Russia. She grew up Dushanbe, the capital of what is now Tajikistan. In 1988, she began to learn Esperanto. She traveled frequently to Esperanto meetings and congresses. Then, in 1993, during the Tajikistani Civil War, she moved to Berlin, where in 1997 she began studying German linguistics at Humboldt University. While in Germany, she married Gerd Bussing, a German Esperantist. She died in 2013 in Berlin.

Literary writing 
Karpunina was known for her contributions to Esperanto literature, which she began writing in the early 1990s. She published two books in Esperanto, both short story collections: La Bato ("The Blow") in 2001 and Neokazinta Amo ("Unrequited Love") in 2007. She also contributed to the Esperanto magazine Monato, writing under the pen name "REGO." Her work frequently drew from her childhood experiences in Tajikistan, and her short stories have been described as "humanist" and "modern."

Her work earned her various awards in the Universal Esperanto Association's artistic competitions. In 2010, she was elected a member of the Akademio de Esperanto, and she was also a member of the Akademio Literatura de Esperanto, often contributing to its literary magazine .

External links 

 "En Granda Urbo" by Lena Karpunina
 "La Amnestipeto" by Lena Karpunina

References 

1963 births
2013 deaths
Russian women writers
Tajikistani women writers
Esperantists
People from Kaluga
Writers of Esperanto literature
Akademio de Esperanto members